Khao Lak–Lam Ru National Park is a national park in Phang Nga Province, Thailand. The park is named for two of its mountain peaks, Khao Lak and Lam Ru. It also encompasses beaches and forests.

Geography
The coastal area here is typically referred to as "Khao Lak". The park is just off Route 4 (Phetkasem Road).

Khao Lak–Lam Ru park covers parts of four districts: Kapong, Mueang Phang Nga, Takua Pa, and Thai Mueang.

History
Originally the park was a seashore park, but in 1984 it was extended to encompass the forested and mountainous area inland and for protection of the province's main drainage basin. On 30 August 1991, Khao Lak–Lam Ru became Thailand's 66th national park.

The December 2004 Indian Ocean tsunami caused high casualties in Khao Lak. Due to its location and shoreline terrain, the area suffered the worst of any area in Thailand, with over 4,000 deaths.

Attractions
The park has numerous large waterfalls, the largest of which is Lam Ru Waterfall, a waterfall of 5 levels and year-round water flow. Other waterfalls include Lam Phrao, Hin Lat, and Ton Chong Fa. The coastal park section at Khao Lak sea shore offers very clear waters and clean, quiet stretches of beach.

Flora and fauna

The park's forest is tropical evergreen forest, including such tree species as takian, Dipterocarpus, Alstonia scholaris, Magnolia champaca, and Anisoptera costata. Palms, bamboo, and epiphytes such as orchids and ferns grow widely throughout.

Nearer the seashore, species such as cashew trees, Barringtonia asiatica, and Pandanus fascicularis (screw pine) flourish.

Smaller mammal species include colugo, binturong, and Malayan weasel. Other animals include banded surili, tiger, Asian tapir, serow, sambar, Asiatic black bear, black giant squirrel, southern red muntjac, common treeshrew, chevrotain, gibbon and wild boar. The park is home to various reptile species including Bengal monitor and Malayan pit viper.

Bird species in the park include crested serpent eagle, white-bellied sea eagle, emerald dove, scarlet minivet, bushy-crested hornbill, and oriental pied hornbill. Other birds include great argus, streaked bulbul, maroon woodpecker, red junglefowl, ashy drongo, common myna, and barbet.

Gallery

See also
List of national parks of Thailand
List of Protected Areas Regional Offices of Thailand

References

External links

National parks of Thailand
Geography of Phang Nga province
Tourist attractions in Phang Nga province
1991 establishments in Thailand
Protected areas established in 1991